The 2016 Buenos Aires ePrix was a Formula E motor race held on 6 February 2016 at the Puerto Madero Street Circuit in Puerto Madero, Buenos Aires, Argentina. It was the fourth championship race of the 2015–16 Formula E season, the single-seater, electrically powered racing car series' second season. It was also the second Buenos Aires ePrix and the 15th Formula E race overall. Sam Bird won the race for his first win of the season.

Report

Background
Mike Conway replaced Jacques Villeneuve who parted ways with the Venturi team.

Salvador Durán re-joined Team Aguri for the rest of the season after they split with Nathanaël Berthon. The Mexican driver already competed in nine rounds of the first season for Team Aguri.

FanBoost was awarded to Jean-Éric Vergne, Sam Bird and Lucas di Grassi.

Classifications

Qualifying 

Notes:

  – Final grid position of top five qualifiers determined by Super Pole shootout.

Super Pole

Race 

Notes:
 – Three points for pole position.
 – Two points for fastest lap.

Standings after the race

Drivers' Championship standings

Teams' Championship standings

 Notes: Only the top five positions are included for both sets of standings.

References

|- style="text-align:center"
|width="35%"|Previous race:2015 Punta del Este ePrix
|width="30%"|FIA Formula E Championship2015–16 season
|width="35%"|Next race:2016 Mexico City ePrix
|- style="text-align:center"
|width="35%"|Previous race:2015 Buenos Aires ePrix
|width="30%"|Buenos Aires ePrix
|width="35%"|Next race:2017 Buenos Aires ePrix
|- style="text-align:center"

2015–16 Formula E season
2016
2016 in Argentine sport
February 2016 sports events in South America